Dorycricus is a genus of tephritid  or fruit flies in the family Tephritidae.

Species
Dorycricus ruater Munro, 1947

References

Tephritinae
Tephritidae genera
Diptera of Africa